The Henderson Pavilion was an amphitheater in Henderson, Nevada used primarily for music performances.

The Henderson Pavilion was known for its  canopy style roof. This allowed for the feeling of both being inside and outdoors at the same time.

The Henderson Pavilion was the largest open-air amphitheater in Nevada and the first of its kind in Southern Nevada.

The Henderson Pavilion was owned by the City of Henderson and was the home of the Henderson Symphony Orchestra, and the host of many of musical events each year.

It was located at 200 South Green Valley Parkway, Henderson, Nevada 89012, south of the I-215 freeway and the Green Valley Ranch. 
The box office was located inside the Henderson Multigenerational Center just adjacent to the venue at 250 South Green Valley Parkway, Henderson, Nevada 89012.

The pavilion was torn down in August 2020 and replaced by the Dollar Loan Center, which houses the Henderson Silver Knights of the American Hockey League, affiliate of the Vegas Golden Knights of the National Hockey League.

See also
 List of contemporary amphitheatres

References

Music venues completed in 2002
Music venues in the Las Vegas Valley
Buildings and structures in Henderson, Nevada
2002 establishments in Nevada
2020 disestablishments in Nevada
Former music venues in the United States